Noah Creshevsky (January 31, 1945 – December 3, 2020) was a composer and electronic musician born in Rochester, New York. He used the term hyperrealism to describe his work.

Biography
Trained in composition by Nadia Boulanger in Paris and Luciano Berio at the Juilliard School, Creshevsky lived and worked in New York beginning in 1966. He taught at Brooklyn College of the City University of New York for thirty-one years, serving as Director of the Brooklyn College Center for Computer Music (BC-CCM) from 1994 to 1999. He also served on the faculties of Juilliard and Hunter College, and has been a visiting professor at Princeton University.

Creshevsky began composing electronic music in 1971. His musical vocabulary used bits of words, songs, and instrumental sounds. By fusing opposites—such as music and noise, comprehensible and incomprehensible vocal sources–Creshevsky attempted to make music that sounded both Western and non-Western, ancient and modern, familiar and unfamiliar.

This alliance of opposites is heard both in his text-sound compositions (1973-1986)—Pop Art works in which extreme and unpredictable juxtapositions of iconographic sonic materials establish links between music and society  —and in later pieces, in which the integration of electronic and acoustic sources and processes “creates virtual ‘superperformers’ by using the sounds of traditional instruments pushed past the capacities of human performance.” 
Creshevsky’s most recent compositions are examples of "Hyperrealism", a term he uses to describe an electroacoustic language constructed from sounds found in our shared environment that he handles in ways that are exaggerated or intense.

Collections of Creshevsky's scores and sound recordings are held at the music libraries of Northwestern University. and the New York Public Library.

Creshevsky was interred on Hart Island at his own request. Usually burials on Hart Island are for the homeless or poor and unclaimed bodies. According to his husband David Sachs, Creshevsky intended to protest the trappings and cost of traditional funerals.

Discography

CDs
Man & Superman (1992) Centaur Records CRC 2126
 Variations (1987)
 Electric String Quartet (1988)
 Memento Mori (1989)
 Electric Partita (1990)
 Talea (1991)

Who (1993) Centaur Records CRC 2476
 Fanfare (1998) 
 Sha (1996)
 Twice (1993)
 Who (1995)
 et puis (1998)
 Gone Now (1995)
 Breathless (1997)
 Nude Ascending (1999)

Auxesis Electronic Music by Charles Amirkhanian and Noah Creshevsky (1995) Centaur Records CRC 2194
 Politics as Usual (Amirkhanian) 
 Borrowed Time (Creshevsky—1992)
 Private Lives (Creshevsky—1993)
 Coup d'état (Creshevsky—1994)
 
Hyperrealism (2003) Mutable Music Mutable 17516-2
 Canto di Malavita (2002)
 Jacob’s Ladder (1999)
 Vol-au-vent (2002)
 Hoodlum Priest (2002)
 Novella (2000)
 Ossi di morte (1997)
 Jubilate (2001)
 Born Again (2003)

The Tape Music of Noah Creshevsky, 1971-1992 (2004) EM Records (Japan) EM 1042CD 
 Strategic Defense Initiative (1986)
 Highway (1979) 
 Circuit (1971) 
 Drummer (1985)
 Great Performances (1978)
 Sonata (1980)
 In Other Words (Portrait of John Cage) (1976)
 Cantiga (1992)

To Know and Not to Know (2007) Tzadik Tzadik-8036
 Red Carpet (2007)
 Psalmus XXIII (2003)
 To Know and Not to Know (2005)
 Once (2004)
 Chamber Concerto (1998)
 Jubilate (2001)
 Sequenza (for trombone) (2004)
 Independence Day (1997)
 Free Speech (2006)

Favorite Encores, Music of Noah Creshevsky and If, Bwana, (2008) Pogus 
Pogus 21049-2
 Mari Kimura Redux (Creshevsky)
 Xyloxings (If, Bwana)
 Shadow of a Doubt (Creshevsky)
 Scraping Scrafide (If, Bwana)
 Intrada (Creshevsky)
 Cicada #4: Version Barnard (If, Bwana)
 Favorite Encores (Creshevsky)

The Twilight of the Gods (2010) Tzadik Tzadik-8069 
 Götterdämmerung
 Omaggio
 Three Minute Waltzes
 Brother Tom
 Estancia
 I Wonder Who's Kissing Her Now
 La Belle Dame Sans Merci
 Happy Ending

Rounded With A Sleep (2011) Pogus Pogus 21063-2
 Rounded With A Sleep
 La Sonnambula 
 Lisa Barnard Redux
 What If 
 Tomomi Adachi Redux II 
 The Kindness of Strangers 
 In Memoriam

The Four Seasons (2013) Tzadik Tzadik-8097
 i. summer
 ii. interlude 1
 iii. autumn
 iv. interlude 2
 v. winter
 vi. interlude 3
 vii. spring

Hyperrealist Music, 2011-2015 (2015) EM Records (Japan) EM 1140CD
 1. Pulp Fiction (2014)
 2. Tomomi Adachi Redux I (2011)
 3. Quaestio (2014)
 4. Orchestral Variations (2013)
 5. Full Fathom Five (2011)
 6. La Valse (2013)
 7. You Are Here (2015)

Sleeping Awake (2019) Open Space Open Space CD 37
 Electric String Quartet (1988)
 Passacaglia (2018)
 Sequenza (for trombone) (2004)
 Sleeping Awake (2017)

Compilation albums
 60x60 (2004-2005) Vox Novus VN-001
 60x60 (2003) Capstone Records CPS-8744

LPs
 Circuit (1971) In Other Words (1976) - Opus One No. 45
 Broadcast (1973) Great Performances (1978) - Opus One No. 47
 Chaconne (1974) Portrait of Rudy Perez (1978) Highway (1979) - Opus One No. 50
 Sonata (1980) - Opus One No. 58
 Celebration (1983) - Opus One No. 101
 Drummer (1985) Strategic Defense Initiative (1986) - Opus One No. 111
 Reanimator (2018) - Orange Milk Records No. 99

Dedications
snapshots (for noah creshevsky) (2003) - Marco Oppedisano

Articles and reviews
 "STUFF MUZAK #1: A (VERY) SOFT FOCUS ON HYPERREALIST MUSIC" by Dwight Pavlovic, Decoder Magazine, June 7, 2016
 "A Language We Already Understand: Noah Creshevsky's Hyperrealism"  By Dennis Báthory-Kitsz, NewMusicBox, June 13, 2007
 "When drawing from preexisting works, how do you balance legal and moral obligations with the potential to create new art?" by Noah Creshevsky, NewMusicBox November 1, 2004

References

Further reading
Hitchcock, H. Wiley: 'Music in the United States'' Prentice Hall, 1988, p. 313.

External links
 CD Review: ‘Twilight of the Gods' by Allan Kozinn New York Times, June 15, 2010
 Brooklyn College Center for Computer Music
http://www.voxnovus.com/composer/creshevsky/Reviews.htm Listing of Creshevsky reviews
“On Borrowed Time” reprint. Originally published in Contemporary Music Review, Volume 20, Number 4, 2001, pp. 91-98(8).
http://www.mvdaily.com/articles/2004/09/creshevsky1.htm Malcolm Tattersall, Music & Vision September 22, 2004

1945 births
2020 deaths
American male classical composers
American classical composers
American electronic musicians
20th-century classical composers
21st-century classical composers
Tzadik Records artists
Brooklyn College faculty
Princeton University faculty
Hunter College faculty
Juilliard School alumni
Pupils of Luciano Berio
21st-century American composers
20th-century American composers
20th-century American male musicians
21st-century American male musicians
Centaur Records artists
People from Rochester, New York